Anne Neville (1456–1485) was an English queen, the daughter of Richard Neville, 16th Earl of Warwick.

Anne Neville may also refer to:
 Anne Beauchamp, 16th Countess of Warwick (1426–1492), mother of Anne Neville
 Anne Neville, Duchess of Buckingham (c. 1408–1480), daughter of Ralph Neville, 1st Earl of Westmorland
 Anne Neville (engineer) (1970–2022), professor at the University of Leeds